SARL Léger Aviation was a French aircraft manufacturer based in Archiac. When it was in operation the company specialized in the design and manufacture of wooden ultralight aircraft in the form of plans for amateur construction. The company also supplied raw material for construction.

The company was a Société à responsabilité limitée.

Founded by father and son team Fabien and Jean Claude Léger the company produced plans and materials  for two designs, the open cockpit Leger Pataplume 1 and the enclosed cockpit Leger Pataplume 2. Both aircraft emphasized simplicity and ease of construction and were marketed with the French slogan "simplicite, economie, amusement".

By 2013 the company website had been removed and the plans were apparently no longer available.

Aircraft

References

External links

Former location of official website
Website archives on Archive.org

Defunct aircraft manufacturers of France
Ultralight aircraft
Homebuilt aircraft